United Spirits Limited, abbreviated to USL, is an Indian alcoholic beverages company, and the world's second-largest spirits company by volume. It is a subsidiary of Diageo, and headquartered at UB Tower in Bangalore, Karnataka. USL exports its products to over 37 countries.

According to the official website of the company, as of March 2013, USL has more than 140 liquor brands, of which 15 brands each sell more than one million cases annually while 3 brands each sell more than 10 million cases annually.

History
The company originated as a trading company called McDowell and Company (also known as McDowell & Co, McDowell or McDowell's), founded in India in 1826 by Angus McDowell, a Scot. He set up a warehouse near Fort St. George, Madras (now Chennai). The company imported liquor, tobacco products, and other consumer goods into India to serve the needs of British people stationed there. The company's principal shareholders were A.M. Hooper, G.D. Coleman, and G.A. Ruppell.

The Vittal Mallya-run United Breweries Group bought McDowell and Company in 1951. In 1959, Mallya established the company's first distillery at Cherthala, Kerala on the banks of the Vembanad lake. McDowell's began bottling Bisquit Brandy and Dorville French Brandy, from imported concentrates, becoming the first company to manufacture Indian Made Foreign Liquor (IMFL). The company opened India's first distillation plant to manufacture extra neutral alcohol (ENA) at Cherthala in 1961. The plant began bottling products for Herbertsons Limited of the Anglo Thai Group that same year. The company launched Golden Grape Brandy, its first original product, in 1962. The company launched McDowell's No.1 Brandy in 1963–64 when their contract with Herbertsons expired. In the early 1960s, the company acquired Carew & Co and Phipson & Co, manufacturers of rum, gin, and other hard liquors in 1963–64.

The company launched McDowell's No.1 whisky in 1968, and commissioned new distilleries in Hyderabad, Ponda (Goa), and Hathidah (Bihar) over the next few years. In the late 1970s, distilleries were acquired in Udaipur, Alwar, Mirganj, and Serampore, and a plant was built in Pondicherry. The company bought out Herbertsons in 1973. Mallya's son, Vijay Mallya, took over as director of McDowell's the same year, and assumed chairmanship of UB Group and McDowell's after Vittal Mallya died in 1983. McDowell's moved its headquarters from Madras to Bangalore in 1987. The company established a technical centre for product and process development research in Bangalore in 1989. McDowell's No.1 Rum was launched in 1990. McDowell's acquired the spirits business and manufacturing facility of Forbes Campbell & Company Limited. McDowell's formed United Distillers India Limited, India's first joint venture in the alcoholic beverages industry, with United Distillers of the United Kingdom in 1991–92. McDowell's Signature whisky was launched in 1994. In 1995, Carew Phipson Limited, Consolidated Distilleries Ltd and several other companies were merged into McDowell's. The company was incorporated as McDowell Spirits Ltd in 1999. The name was changed to McDowell & Company Ltd on 1 April 2000. McDowell Alcobev became a wholly owned subsidiary of McDowell & Company in 2002. In the same year, the company acquired Phipson Distilley, McDowell International Brands Ltd, and most of Triumph Distilleries & Vinters Pvt Ltd. McDowell launched Derby Special Whisky in 2003 and Old Cask rum in 2004.

On 21 March 2005, McDowell & Company entered into an agreement with Jumbo World Holdings Limited (JWHL) in Dubai to acquire Shaw Wallace. The board of Shaw Wallace approved the merger of the company with USL and fixed the appointed date of the merger as 1 April 2008 subject to approvals. In 2006, McDowell & Co Limited, Herbertsons Limited, Triumph Distillers and Vintners Private Limited, Baramati Grape Industries India Limited, Shaw Wallace Distilleries Limited and four other companies are merged to form United Spirits Limited. Bouvet Ladubay, subsidiary of France-based Taittinger was acquired, the same year. The UB Group purchased Whyte & Mackay in May 2007 for £595 million. USL also acquired Liquidity Inc., makers of Pinky Vodka, in 2007. USL launched Black Dog 18 YO and Four Seasons Barrique Reserve in 2009–10, and McDowell's No 1 Platinum, 100% grain based whisky, in 2011.

It also separately acquired an additional 58,668 shares for  85,778,082. Under pressure from Diageo, some substantial changes to the management structure of the firm began to take place in 2013.

In 2014, Diageo's share holdings rose to 54.8% of USL.

In early 2014, Whyte & Mackay, which had been purchased by UB Group in 2007, was sold to Philippines-based Emperador for £430 million.

On 5 November 2017, the Paradise Papers, a set of confidential electronic documents relating to offshore investment, revealed that United Spirits with three other subsidiaries based in the UK were allegedly involved with diverting funds amounting to $1.5 billion.

Technical centre
The USL technical centre was opened in 1989 in Bangalore, and is recognised by the Department of Scientific & Industrial Research (DSIR) as an in-house Research & Development laboratory.

United Spirits brands
USL manufactures Indian whisky, Scotch whisky, brandy, rum, vodka, gin and wine.

Indian whisky
 Antiquity 
 Bagpiper 
 McDowell's No.1
 McDowell's No.1 Platinum
 McDowell's Single Malt 
 Royal Challenge
 Signature
Scotch whisky
 Black Dog

Wine
 Bouvet Ladubay
 Four Seasons
Vodka
 Pinky
 Romanov
 Vladivar
 White Mischief

 Brandy
 Honey Bee
 McDowell's VSOP

Rum
 McDowell's No.1 Celebration

Gin
 Blue Riband

Beer
Kingfisher

Distillery locations
USL owns several distilleries throughout India, and also owns one unit in Nepal. Besides these, USL also has several contract and associate distilleries in India, and one in Nepal.

Operational USL owned units
 Malkajgiri, Hyderabad, Telangana 
 Nacharam, Hyderabad, Telangana 
 Bethora-Ponda, Goa
 Gopalpur, Odisha
 Kumbalgodu, Bangalore, Karnataka
 Aurangabad, Maharashtra
 Baramati, Maharashtra
 Nasik, Maharashtra
 Alwar, Rajasthan
 Udaipur, Rajasthan
 Nimapara, Odisha
 Pioneer Distillery, Nanded, Maharashtra
 Rosa, Shahjahanpur district, Uttar Pradesh 
 Asansol, West Bengal

Contract and associate units 
 Rhizome Distilleries Pvt. Ltd (Hyderabad, Telangana)
 Esveear Dist (Tirupati, Andhra Pradesh)
 Continental Distillery (Vijayawada, Andhra Pradesh)
 North East Distilleries Pvt Ltd (Guwahati, Assam)
 Surma Distillery Pvt Ltd (Silchar, Assam)
 M T M Wines & Bottlers Pvt Limited (Naharlagun, Arunachal Pradesh)  
 Chitwan Blenders & Bottlers Pvt Ltd (Bihar)
 Salson Liquors Pvt Ltd (Bihar)
 Aegis Beverages (P) Ltd (Bilaspur, Chhattisgarh)
 Khemani Distilleries Pvt Ltd (Daman)
 Saraya Industries Ltd (New Delhi)
 Mandovi Distilleries & Breweries Pvt Ltd (Goa)
 A B Sugars Ltd (Haryana)
 Sir Shadilal Distillery & Chemical Works (Haryana)
 Trishul Bottlers (Jammu and Kashmir)
 Ajantha Bottlers & Blenders Pvt Ltd (Ranchi, Jharkhand)
 Ambient Liquors Pvt Ltd (Jharkhand)
 Karnataka Breweries & Distilleries Ltd (Bangalore, Karnataka)
 Seven Seas Distillery Pvt Ltd (Mannuthy, Thrissur, Kerala)
 Ajantha Distilleries (Nagpur, Maharashtra) 
 Rainbow Distilleries Pvt Ltd (Nagpur, Maharashtra) 
 Jubilant Organosys Limited (Pune, Maharashtra)
 Ravi-Kumar Distillery (Pondicherry)
 Vinbros Dist (Pondicherry)
 Mount Distillery (Sikkim) 
 Golden Midas Dist (Chennai, Tamil Nadu)
 Shiva Distillery (Coimbatore, Tamil Nadu)
 Gemini Distilleries (Tripura) Pvt Ltd (Tripura) 
 United Brothers Distilleries Private Limited (Arunachal Pradesh)k
 Himalayan Distillery Pvt Ltd (Nepal)

References

External links

Distilleries in India
Drink companies of India
Manufacturing companies based in Bangalore
Food and drink companies established in 1826
1826 establishments in British India
Indian companies established in 1826
United Breweries Group
Companies listed on the National Stock Exchange of India
Companies listed on the Bombay Stock Exchange
Indian companies established in 1999